Vicente Arenari Filho (born 23 March 1935 in Natividade, Rio de Janeiro, died 14 July 2013 in Natividade) is a retired Brazilian professional football player, who played as defender and currently a manager.

Career as a player
Began in Flamengo's youth teams, where he start his professional career in 1954. Later he played for the teams: Bahia, Palmeiras and Nacional-SP, where he finished his career in 1967.

Career as a manager
Since 1968 he coached the clubs: Nacional-SP, Palmeiras, Botafogo, Mogi Mirim, Ferroviária, Santo André, Saad, Caxias, Esportivo, Juventude, Joinville, Figueirense, Chapecoense, Uberlândia, Americano, Goytacaz and Itaperuna.

On July 14, 2013, on a Sunday night, the former player Vicente Arenari died aged 78, suffered a stroke.

References

External links

1935 births
2013 deaths
Sportspeople from Rio de Janeiro (state)
Association football defenders
Brazilian footballers
CR Flamengo footballers
Esporte Clube Bahia players
Sociedade Esportiva Palmeiras players
Nacional Atlético Clube (SP) players
Brazilian football managers
Nacional Atlético Clube (SP) managers
Sociedade Esportiva Palmeiras managers
Botafogo de Futebol e Regatas managers
Mogi Mirim Esporte Clube managers
Associação Ferroviária de Esportes managers
Esporte Clube Santo André managers
Sociedade Esportiva e Recreativa Caxias do Sul managers
Clube Esportivo Bento Gonçalves managers
Esporte Clube Juventude managers
Joinville Esporte Clube managers
Figueirense FC managers
Associação Chapecoense de Futebol managers
Uberlândia Esporte Clube managers
Americano Futebol Clube managers
Goytacaz Futebol Clube managers
Itaperuna Esporte Clube managers